Nopyllus is a genus of spiders in the family Prodidominae. It was first described in 2014 by Ott, both found in Brazil. , it contains 2 species.

References

Prodidominae
Araneomorphae genera
Spiders of Brazil